Landscape with Arched Bridge is a circa 1637-1638 landscape painting by the Dutch Golden Age painter Rembrandt in the collection of the Gemäldegalerie, Berlin.

Painting 
This painting was documented by Hofstede de Groot in 1915, who wrote:

The picture was purchased a decade later for the museum by Bode himself as curator in 1924 when the Duke's Oldenburg Gallery was sold. It is the same size and manner of The Stone Bridge of the Rijksmuseum and was long considered a later copy by Rembrandt pupil Govert Flinck but a recent dendrochronological study has shown that the Berlin panel predates the Amsterdam panel, dismissing the idea it could be a copy.

See also
List of paintings by Rembrandt

References

Sources
Landscape with a seven arched bridge, c. 1638 in the RKD

Paintings by Rembrandt
1630s paintings
Bridges in art
Paintings in the Gemäldegalerie, Berlin